Union Royale Belge des Sociétés de Football Association ASBL v Jean-Marc Bosman (1995) C-415/93 (known as the Bosman ruling) is a 1995  European Court of Justice decision concerning freedom of movement for workers, freedom of association, and direct effect of article 39 (now article 45 of the Treaty on the Functioning of the European Union) of the TEC. The case was an important decision on the free movement of labour and had a profound effect on the transfers of footballers—and by extension players of other professional sports—within the European Union (EU).

The decision banned restrictions on foreign EU players within national leagues and allowed players in the EU to move to another club at the end of a contract without a transfer fee being paid.

The ruling was made in a consolidation of three separate legal cases, all involving Belgian player Jean-Marc Bosman:
 Belgian Football Association v Jean-Marc Bosman
 R.F.C. de Liège v Jean-Marc Bosman and others
 UEFA v Jean-Marc Bosman

Facts
Jean-Marc Bosman was a player for RFC Liège in the Belgian First Division whose contract had expired in 1990. He wanted to change teams and move to Dunkerque, a French club. However, Dunkerque refused to meet his Belgian club's transfer fee demand, so Liège refused to release Bosman.

In the meantime, Bosman's wages were reduced by 70% as he was no longer a first-team player. He took his case to the European Court of Justice in Luxembourg and sued for restraint of trade, citing FIFA's rules regarding football, specifically Article 17.

Judgment
On 15 December 1995, the court ruled the system, as it was constituted, placed a restriction on the free movement of workers and was prohibited by Article 39(1) of the EC Treaty (now Article 45 (1) of the Treaty on the functioning of the European Union). Bosman and all other EU footballers were given the right to a free transfer at the expiration of their contracts, provided that they transfer from a club within one EU association to a club within another EU association.

Significance to football
Prior to the Bosman ruling, professional clubs in some parts of Europe (but not, for example, in Spain and France) were able to prevent players from joining a club in another country even if their contracts had expired. In the United Kingdom, Transfer Tribunals had been in place since 1981 to resolve disputes over fees between clubs when transferring players at the end of their contracts. The Bosman ruling meant that players could move to a new club at the end of their contract without their old club receiving a fee. Players can now agree a pre-contract with another club for a free transfer if the players' contract with their existing club has six months or less remaining.

The Bosman ruling also prohibited domestic football leagues in EU member states, and also UEFA, from imposing quotas on foreign players to the extent that they discriminated against nationals of EU states. At that time, many leagues placed quotas restricting the number of non-nationals allowed on member teams. Also, UEFA had a rule that prohibited teams in its competitions, namely the Champions League, Cup Winners' Cup and UEFA Cup, from naming more than three "foreign" players in their squads for any game. After the ruling, quotas could still be imposed, but only used to restrict the number of non-EU players on each team.

According to a 2021 study, the Bosman ruling increased the competitiveness of national team football because it encouraged greater talent development. However, it reduced competition in the Champions League, as non-established teams tended to sell their best players rather than compete against the best teams. The ruling also affected football in other continents, as the foreign slots would be filled by non-EU players, exponentially allowing teams to obtain south american, african and asian players.

Players
Since the ruling came into effect throughout the EU in 1995, several notable players in European football have benefited from the ruling. In 1996, Edgar Davids became Europe's first high-profile player to benefit from the ruling when he moved from Ajax to Milan. Ex-Hibernian FC player, Paul Kane became the first UK Bosman transfer, moving from Aberdeen FC to Norwegian side Viking Stavanger in 1996. In 1999, Steve McManaman became the most lucrative transfer at the time in British football, as "Britain's first high-profile Bosman departure", when he moved from Liverpool to Real Madrid and the deal resulted in McManaman becoming the highest paid British player in history, from 1999 to 2001. Since Davids and McManaman, scores of other notable players became able to negotiate deals according to their market value when their contracts expired, a trend that continued into the 2000s and beyond.

Clubs
The ruling meant that clubs could no longer block a move or demand a fee, from the player or from the destination club, if the player left at the end of their contracts.

The Bosman ruling coincided directly with a new era of financial gains in football. In 2005, UEFA declared it was seeking to repair aspects of the ruling because it was believed to be the cause of the increasing rich-poor gap between elite and smaller clubs.

Significance in EU law
Bosman confirmed the "rule of reason" approach of the courts used in the important Cassis de Dijon case as not only suitable for issues relating to movement of goods within the EU, but also for cases concerning the free movement of workers.
 
If free movement is indistinctly applied (i.e. not just against foreign nationals) it could be justified if...
 The measures used were in pursuit of a legitimate aim
That aim was justified by pressing reasons of public interest

The case also alludes to the fact that Alpine Investments v Minister van Financiën provides a similar test for services, and Gebhard v Consiglio dell'Ordine degli Avvocati e Procuratori di Milano for establishment.

Other cases
The Bosman ruling was considered and distinguished in Lehtonen (2000), a similar case which involved a deadline imposed by FIBA after which basketball teams could not include players who had played for another team in the same season, where it was found that such a restriction was lawful.

See also

 Retain and transfer system
 Free agent
 Kingaby v Aston Villa, a similar 1912 court case in England
 Eastham v Newcastle United, a similar 1963 court case in England
 Seitz decision, a similar 1975 arbitration case in the North American Major League Baseball
 Kolpak ruling, which extended Bosman to countries with an associate trading relationship with the EU, most notably the ACP countries
 Webster ruling, a post-Bosman ruling which formalised the 'buy-out' rules for disputed transfers of players still within their contract term
 6+5 rule
 Meca-Medina ruling, the ruling that finally decided whether all sports federations and national leagues were obligated to follow the EU laws

Notes

External links
 Text of the ECJ Ruling EUR-Lex, Publications Office of the European Union
 
 

Labour law
Court of Justice of the European Union case law
1995 in case law
Association football in Europe
Association football terminology
Association football transfers
Association football rules and regulations
Association football law
Sports law
1993–94 in Belgian football
1994–95 in Belgian football
1993–94 in European football
1994–95 in European football